Ludwig II ( 1137–1181) was the count of Württemberg from 1158 to 1181.

He was married to Willibirg (1142–1179), daughter of Hartmann III, Count of Kirchberg and had issue:
 Hartmann, Count of Württemberg
 Ludwig III, Count of Württemberg

References 

1130s births
1181 deaths
12th-century counts of Württemberg
Year of birth uncertain